Pseudoclasseya inopinata is a moth in the family Crambidae. It was described by Graziano Bassi in 1989. It is found in Yunnan, China.

References

Crambinae
Moths described in 1989